In geometry, the medial icosacronic hexecontahedron (or midly sagittal ditriacontahedron) is a nonconvex isohedral polyhedron. It is the dual of the uniform icosidodecadodecahedron. Its faces are darts. Part of each dart lies inside the solid, hence is invisible in solid models.

Proportions 
Its dihedral angles equal .

References

External links 
 

Dual uniform polyhedra